Lac-de-la-Pomme is an unorganized territory in the Laurentides region of Quebec, Canada, and one of eleven unorganized areas in the Antoine-Labelle Regional County Municipality.

See also
 List of unorganized territories in Quebec

References

Unorganized territories in Laurentides